In Norse mythology, the Swedish king Domar (Old Norse Dómarr, "Judge") of the House of Ynglings was the son of Domalde. He was married to Drott, the sister of Dan the Arrogant who gave his names to the Danes. Drott and Dan are in this work said to be the children of Danp son of Ríg.

His rule lasted long and after the sacrifice of his father Domalde, the crops were plentiful and peace reigned. Consequently, there is not much to tell about his reign, and when he died at Uppsala, he was transported over the Fyris Wolds (Fyrisvellir) and burnt on the banks of the river, where a stone was raised over his ashes.

He was succeeded by his son Dyggvi.

Attestations
Snorri Sturluson wrote of Domar in his Ynglinga saga (1225):

The information about Domar's marriage appears after Snorri has presented Domar's son Dyggvi (Danish tongue refers to the Old Norse language as a whole and not only to the dialect of Denmark):

As for Domar, Snorri included a piece from Ynglingatal (9th century):

The Historia Norwegiæ presents a Latin summary of Ynglingatal, older than Snorri's quotation:

The even earlier source Íslendingabók cites the line of descent in Ynglingatal and also gives Dómarr as the successor of Dómaldr and the predecessor of Dyggvi: viii Dómaldr. ix Dómarr. x Dyggvi.

Notes

References
McKinnell, John (2005). Meeting the Other in Norse Myth and Legend. D. S. Brewer.

Sources
Ynglingatal
Ynglinga saga (part of the Heimskringla)
Historia Norwegiae

Mythological kings of Sweden